Darnell Wilson (born June 23, 1966) is an American former boxer. That was a 1996 Light Middleweight US Olympic Alternate.

Amateur career
Born on the Southside of Chicago, Wilson started boxing in 1980 at the age of 14. He was coached by Tom O'Shea. Wilson was an amateur standout and was the 1993 National Golden Gloves Light Middleweight Champion.  He later went on to become the United States Amateur Light middleweight champion in 1997–1999. Chicago Golden Gloves finalist (1986). He won the Chicago Golden Gloves from 1990-1992 U.S. Olympic alternate (1996).

Professional career
Wilson turned professional in 2002 and was undefeated in his first 8 fights, including a win over journeyman Reggie Strickland, he also had a draw with Ishmail Arvin before losing to Chad Dawson by decision in 2004 for the WBC World Youth middleweight title. Wilson fought three times after this going 1-0-2. He retired in 2012 after a draw with undefeated fighter Paul Littleton.

References

Enternal links
 

Boxers from Indiana
Light-middleweight boxers
Boxers from Chicago
National Golden Gloves champions
1966 births
Living people
Winners of the United States Championship for amateur boxers
Sportspeople from Lafayette, Indiana
American male boxers